Spring of Life (Spanish: Primavera de la vida, Swedish: Livets vår) is 1957 Argentine-Swedish drama film directed by Arne Mattsson and starring Nicole Berger, Folke Sundquist and Pedro Laxalt. It was shot in studios in Buenos Aires and on location in the region. The film's sets were designed by the art director Gori Muñoz. The film tried to exploit the success of Mattson's earlier film One Summer of Happiness which had also starred Sundquist.

Synopsis
Young couple Elisa Fernandez and Marcelo are in love, but she is distressed that he is going away to Buenos Aires to study. Her strict father opposes their relationship, but Marcelo tries to find a way in order to raise the money so that she can come to the city with him.

Cast
 Nicole Berger as Elisa Fernandez
 Folke Sundquist as Marcelo
 Pedro Laxalt as 	Mr. Fernandez
 Elisardo Santalla as 	Don Manuelo
 Norma Giménez as 	Rosita
 Marisa Núñez as 	Mercedes
 Horacio Priani as 	Lopez
 Alita Román as 	Doña Elena

References

Bibliography 
  Cowie, Peter Françoise Buquet, Risto Pitkänen & Godfried Talboom. Scandinavian Cinema: A Survey of the Films and Film-makers of Denmark, Finland, Iceland, Norway, and Sweden. Tantivy Press, 1992.
 Soila, Tytti. The Cinema of Scandinavia.  Wallflower Press, 2005.

External links 
 

1957 films
Swedish drama films
1957 drama films
Argentine drama films
1950s Spanish-language films
1950s Swedish-language films
Films directed by Arne Mattsson
Films set in Buenos Aires
Films shot in Buenos Aires
1950s Swedish films